Lajkovac (selo) is a village situated in Lajkovac municipality in Serbia.

References

Populated places in Kolubara District